Tim Gay (born July 9, 1964) is an American politician from Nebraska who served in the Nebraska Legislature from 2007 to 2011.

Biography
Gay was born on July 9, 1979. He obtained a bachelor's degree from the University of Nebraska–Lincoln in 1987. Prior to entering politics, Gay worked as a grain broker.

Gay served on the Sarpy County Board of Commissioners from 1994 to 2006.

In 2006, Gay ran for election to the Nevada Legislature, defeating Ian Hartfield in the general election. He represented Nebraska's 14th legislative district from 2007 to 2011. During his time in office, Gay served on the Health and Human Services Committee, as well as the Transportation and Telecommunications Committee. He did not seek re-election in 2010.

Gay resides in Papillion, Nebraska. He is not affiliated with any political party.

References

1964 births
Living people
21st-century American politicians
Nebraska state senators
People from Papillion, Nebraska